NGC 3949 is an unbarred spiral galaxy in the constellation Ursa Major.  It is believed to be approximately 50 million light-years away from the Earth. NGC 3949 is a member of the M109 Group, a group of galaxies located in the constellation Ursa Major that may contain over 50 galaxies.  The brightest galaxy in the group is the spiral galaxy M109.

The type II supernova SN 2000db is the only supernova that has been observed within NGC 3949.

References

External links
 

Unbarred spiral galaxies
M109 Group
Ursa Major (constellation)
3949
06869
037290